Maddalena, Zero for Conduct (Italian: Maddalena... zero in condotta) is a 1940 Italian "white-telephones" comedy film directed by Vittorio De Sica. It is a remake of the Hungarian film Magda Expelled (1938).

Plot
A mysterious love letter arrives to Alfredo Hartman (Vittorio De Sica) in Vienna, and he goes to Rome to find who wrote it.

Cast
Vittorio De Sica as Alfredo Hartman
Vera Bergman as L'insegnante Elisa Malgari
Carla Del Poggio as Maddalena Lenci
Irasema Dilián as Eva Barta, la privatista (as Eva Dilian)
Amelia Chellini as La direttrice
Pina Renzi as La professoressa Varzi
Paola Veneroni as L'allieva Varghetti, la spiona
Dora Bini as L'allieva Caricati
Enza Delbi as Un'allieva
Roberto Villa as Stefano Armani
Armando Migliari as Malesci, il professore di chimica
Guglielmo Barnabò as Il signor Emilio Lenci
Giuseppe Varni as Amilcare Bondani, il bidello
Arturo Bragaglia as Sila, il professore di ginnastica

References

Bibliography
 Cardullo, Bert. Vittorio De Sica: Actor, Director, Auteur. Cambridge Scholars Publishing, 2009.

External links
 

1940 films
1940s Italian-language films
Films directed by Vittorio De Sica
Italian black-and-white films
1940 comedy films
Italian remakes of foreign films
Remakes of Hungarian films
Italian comedy films
1940s Italian films